Yuri George Kulishenko was a  Ukrainian American international soccer player who earned one cap for the U.S. National and Olympic Teams in 1959.

Kulishenko played club soccer for the Philadelphia Ukrainians. He was voted MVP of the American Soccer League in 1959.

Kulishenko was a Ukrainian immigrant to U.S.A.

References

Year of birth missing
Year of death missing
Philadelphia Ukrainian Nationals players
American soccer players
American people of Ukrainian descent
Association football goalkeepers